James Christian Abegglen (1926–2007) was an American-born Japanese business theorist and professor in management and economics at Sophia University. He was one of the founders of the Boston Consulting Group (BCG) in 1963, and the first representative director of its Tokyo branch, founded in 1966.

Biography 
Abegglen was born in Michigan. After graduation from the University of Chicago, he served in the Third Marine Division to fight at Guadalcanal Island and Iwo Jima. As World War II ended, he left in 1945 for Hiroshima as a member of the United States Strategic Bombing Survey (USSBS). He visited Japan again in 1955 as a researcher of the Ford Foundation, to study Japanese industrial organization and personnel practices.

Abegglen lived permanently in Japan with his Japanese wife after 1982 and took Japanese nationality in 1997.

Abegglen served successively as professor and director of the Graduate School of Comparative Culture at Sophia University, chairperson of Asia Advisory Service K.K., and dean emeritus of Globis University in 2006. He taught "Management of Japanese Enterprises" at that school until his death from cancer on May 2, 2007.

Work 
Abegglen's academic interests centered on Japanese enterprises and economic systems and their priority to western capitalism.

The Japanese Factory 
The Japanese Factory, published in 1958, pointed out the following features of employment and the strength of their mechanism in Japanese corporations:
 Lifetime employment: Employment extends over the whole working life of the employee
 Seniority-based wages: Compensation is determined by the number of years of employment in the company
 Periodic hiring: Employing young people fresh out of school
 In-company training: Employing workers based on personal qualities rather than job suitability, providing on-the-job training after hire
 Enterprise union: one labour union for each enterprise
Those employment practices, in strong contrast with the West, often at first startled and intrigued people in the United States, thus his book became a best-seller.

Criticism 
Abegglen was widely regarded as a reliable guide to Japan by Western business interests in the post-war era. Critics like Eamonn Fingleton argue, however, that he "regarded his principal function as doing public relations on behalf of the Japanese establishment," that he misled Western leaders and the Western public about the openness of Japanese markets, and that he kept his change of nationality secret.

Publications 
Abegglen authored and co-authored ten books on Japan. A selection:
 The Japanese Factory (1958)
 Big Business in America (1955)
 Kaisha, the Japanese Corporation (1985)
 Sea Change: Pacific Asia as the New World Industrial Center (Free Press: 1994)
 21st Century Japanese Management: New Systems, Lasting Values (Palgrave Macmillan: 2006)

References 

1926 births
2007 deaths
American business theorists
Boston Consulting Group people
American emigrants to Japan
Naturalized citizens of Japan
University of Chicago alumni
Military personnel from Michigan
Writers from Michigan
Academic staff of Sophia University
United States Marine Corps personnel of World War II